Bastiaan Ort (born 6 January 1854 in Gorinchem – died 4 November 1927 in The Hague) was a Dutch lawyer, judge and politician. As an independent liberal he was Minister of Justice in the Cort van der Linden cabinet from 1913 to 1918.

References 
 Equivalent article on the Dutch Wikipedia.

1854 births
1927 deaths
19th-century Dutch lawyers
20th-century Dutch judges
Leiden University alumni
Ministers of Justice of the Netherlands
People from Gorinchem